This is a list of Italian television related events from 1986.

Debuts

Fininvest

Variety 

 Cabaret per una notte – television version of the Loano Cabaret festival; 3 seasons. The show reveals to the general public the duo Aldo and Giovanni (not again teamed up with Giacomo), winners of the first edition.

Television shows

RAI

Miniseries 

 Attentato al papa (Shooting the pope) – by Giuseppe Fina, in two episodes; reconstruction of the attempted assassination of Pope John Paul II, following the theory (not confirmed by the enquiries) of the Bulgarian connection.  Christopher Bucholz gives an amazing performance as Mehmet Ali Ağca, thanks in part to his physical resemblance to the failed assassin.
La piovra 2 – by Florestano Vancini, with Michele Placido, Sergio Fantoni, Martin Balsam and Francois Perier; 6 episodes. Follow-up of La piovra; the focus moves from the Mafia in the strict sense to its accomplices in deviated Freemasonry and State apparatus.
La storia (History) – by Luigi Comencini, from the Elsa Morante’s novel, with Claudia Cardinale; 3 episodes.
Naso di cane (Dog nose) – by Pasquale Squitieri, with Nigel Bruce, Luca De Filippo and Claudia Cardinale, from the Attilio Veraldi’s novel; in 3 episodes. Firsti TV fiction about the camorra; in Naples, a killer and a police chief are adversaries and at the same time friends, till both die in a shooting.

News and educational 
Il coraggio e la pietà (Courage and pity) – enquiry by Nicola Caracciolo about the racial laws and the Holocaust in Italy; 3 episodes.

Fininvest

Serials 

 Love me Licia, with Cristina D’Avena and Pasquale Finicelli; live adaptation of the manga Ai Shite Knight. Infamous as an example of TV kitsch, it gets however a good success among the younger viewiers.

References 

1986 in Italian television